Cornellà Riera is a railway station on the Llobregat–Anoia Line. It is located underneath Passeig dels Ferrocarrils Catalans, in the Cornellà de Llobregat municipality, to the south-west of Barcelona, in Catalonia, Spain. It is served by Barcelona Metro line 8, Baix Llobregat Metro lines S33, S4 and S8, and commuter rail lines R5, R6, R50 and R60.

The station was opened in 1985, when the line's section between Sant Josep and Cornellà Riera stations was put underground. The original at-grade station dates from 1912, and the current underground station is more or less situated underneath it.

Cornellà Riera serves as the main public transport access to RCD Espanyol's Cornellà-El Prat Stadium.

External links

 Information and photos of the station at trenscat.cat 
 Information and photos of the station at WEFER 
 Video on train operations at the station on YouTube

Railway stations in Spain opened in 1912
Barcelona Metro line 8 stations
Stations on the Llobregat–Anoia Line
Transport in Cornellà de Llobregat
Railway stations in Baix Llobregat
Railway stations located underground in Spain